Teresa Lourdes Borrego Campos (born 31 August 1965) is a Spanish radio and TV presenter, tertulia participant, and businesswoman. She is the elder daughter of journalist and presenter María Teresa Campos.

Biography

Early years
Her sister Carmen Borrego was born in 1966.

She took COU classes at Málaga's . In 1987 she directed and presented Las Mañanas de la Cadena Rato for Radio Torcal in Málaga.

Professional career
In 1988 she appeared in the film Zocta, solo en la Tierra se puede ser extraterrestre, directed by Joe Rígoli. That year she also left radio to join Jesús Hermida's program  as producer and musical coordinator, and later her mother's programs  (1989–1990) and Ésta es su casa (1990–1991). In 1990 she presented several programs (musicals and interviews), while continuing her activity as a music producer on TVE's . She likewise participated in TVE's Christmas program .

In 1995 she appeared in four chapters of the Antena 3 series , playing the sister of Almudena. In 1996 she moved to Telecinco to write and co-present María Teresa Campos' program  until June 1997. In 1997 she also presented the Miss Spain gala.

In June 1997, she began to present an interview and variety program called En Exclusiva, broadcast by Nou and Telemadrid. That September she began to combine this with presenting the magazine  on Telemadrid. This was on the air until June 2004. In September 2004 she was hired by Antena 3, where she collaborated with her mother on the morning program . That year she also presented the game show La Granja on the same channel. In 2005 she returned to present the second edition of La Granja.

From 2006 to 2007 she participated in the monologue contest  on laSexta. In the last quarter of 2008, she participated as a contestant in Mira quién baila on TVE, along with Ana Obregón and Vicky Martín Berrocal.

In 2007, she was hired by Telecinco, a channel where she continues to work today, debuting as a contributor on the show . In addition, from 2010 to 2014 she presented  (later known as Sábado Deluxe) during holiday periods. In February 2011, she led the special La Caja Deluxe.

In January 2014, she announced on the Telecinco program Sálvame that she would take a few months off from television, since she was not happy working. That July she confirmed her return to television after the summer to resume her role as a contributor on Sálvame.

In 2016 she became the protagonist, along with her mother, of the Telecinco docu-reality show .

In 2017 she participated for a week as a kitchen coach of the house, out of competition, on the fifth edition of Gran Hermano VIP.

She has been the administrator of her own company, Rubitecam, S.L., since 1997.

She was one of five presenters of the 2017–2018 New Year's Eve show.

Personal life
Terelu was married to Miguel Ángel Polvorinos from 1993 to 1996. Two years later she married Alejandro Rubio, with whom she has a daughter, Alejandra Rubio Borrego. The couple divorced in 2003. Since then she has had relationships with Pipi Estrada, Kike Calleja, Carlos Pombo, and José Valenciano.

On 14 November 2011, Terelu was on the cover of Interviú magazine. On 16 January 2012, she announced on Sálvame that she was temporarily leaving television because, she said:

On 19 January, Terelu Campos left the hospital, saying that she felt well and that she was going to continue treatment.

In July 2018, she had to undergo another operation after a tumor was detected, this time in her left breast.

Career

TV programs

Reality shows

Radio programs

Films

TV series

Published works
 Frente al espejo (2017, together with Kike Calleja)

References

External links
 
 

1965 births
21st-century Spanish women writers
Living people
People from Málaga
Radio directors
Reality dancing competition contestants
Spanish radio presenters
Spanish women radio presenters
Spanish television presenters
Spanish women television presenters
Women radio directors